Eric Blakeley, MBE,
(born 1965), is a mountaineer, adventurer, television journalist, and resident of Jersey. He has climbed the Seven Summits, the highest mountains on each continent, including Mount Everest. He swam the English Channel in 2003. He is a reporter for Channel Television.

In 1997, he was awarded the Churchill Award for Courage by the States of Jersey, for his climb of Everest.

In 2004, he received an MBE for services to mountaineering, sport and charity.

References 

Members of the Order of the British Empire
Summiters of the Seven Summits
Jersey journalists
Living people
1965 births